Dadi Denis (born August 13, 1976) is a retired Haitian sprinter, who specialized in the 400 metres. Being born and raised in the United States, Denis represented his parental nation Haiti at the 2004 Summer Olympics, and also became a member of the track and field team for Morgan State Bears, under his head coach Neville Hodge, while studying at the Morgan State University in Baltimore, Maryland.

Denis qualified for the men's 400 metres at the 2004 Summer Olympics in Athens, by attaining a B-standard time of 45.89. He threw down a personal best of 47.57 in heat six, but faded only to seventh and did not advance further into the semifinals, trailing behind U.S. sprinter and eventual winner Jeremy Wariner by a two-second deficit.

References

External links

1976 births
Living people
Haitian male sprinters
Olympic athletes of Haiti
Athletes (track and field) at the 2004 Summer Olympics
Morgan State Bears men's track and field athletes
American sportspeople of Haitian descent